Afidnes (or Ἀφίδναι, from the Middle Ages until 1919: Κιούρκα - Kiourka) is a small town in East Attica, Greece. Since the 2011 local government reform it is part of the municipality Oropos, of which it is a municipal unit. The municipal unit has an area of 34.638 km2. It is situated in the eastern foothills of the Parnitha mountains, 3 km southwest of Polydendri, 5 km southeast of Malakasa and 27 km north of Athens city centre. Afidnes has a station on the railway from Athens to Thessaloniki. The Motorway 1 (Athens - Lamia - Thessaloniki) passes east of the town. It is part of Athens metropolitan area.

Ancient Aphidna was one of the twelve ancient towns of Attica. In Greek mythology, Aphidna was the place where Theseus left Helen after he had abducted her. The archaeological site of Aphidnae is small. It was excavated in the 19th century. 13 Middle Helladic tumuli have been found.

Settlements

The municipal unit Afidnes consists of the following settlements:
Afidnes (2011 census pop. 1,908)
Agía Triada (959)
Drosopigi (156)
Kokkinovrachos (195)
Kosmothea (131)
Stathmos Afidnon (293)

Historical population

Markopoulou has historically been an Arvanite settlement.

Places of interest

Beletsi Lake, a small lake on the east slopes of Parnitha, near Afidnes. It is important place for migratory birds.
Monastery of Holy Angels, modern monastery near Afidnes

Persons
Callistratus of Aphidnae, an ancient Archon of Athens.
Callimachus, the Athenian Polemarch at the Battle of Marathon.

See also
List of municipalities of Attica

References

External links
http://plato-dialogues.org/tools/loc/aphidnae.htm
https://web.archive.org/web/20050517170833/http://www.geocities.com/ts_john_2000/, in Greek (Archived 2009-10-24)

Populated places in East Attica
Cities in ancient Attica
Oropos
Arvanite settlements